Dean Spielmann (born 26 October 1962) is a Luxembourgish lawyer and a former president of the European Court of Human Rights. He has been a judge of the European Court of Human Rights in respect of Luxembourg since 2004, president of the Fifth Section of the Court since 2011 and was elected vice-president and then, shortly afterwards, president in 2012. He is also a member of the Grand Ducal Institute of Luxembourg and has held academic posts at the universities of Luxembourg, Nancy and Louvain.

Early life
Spielmann was born in Luxembourg and studied law at the Catholic University of Louvain in Belgium (bachelor's degree, 1988) and Fitzwilliam College, Cambridge in the United Kingdom (Master of Laws, 1990).

Legal career
Spielmann was admitted to the Luxembourg Bar in 1989, practising there until 2004. From 1991 to 1997, he was assistant lecturer in criminal law at the Catholic University of Louvain. He also taught at the University of Luxembourg from 1996 to 2004 and the University of Nancy from 1997 to 2008. He has been the judge of the European Court of Human Rights in respect of Luxembourg since 24 June 2004, and president of the Fifth Section of the Court since 1 February 2011. He will serve as vice-president of the European Court of Human Rights for an initial term of three years from 13 September 2012. He was president of the court between 2012 and 2015.  He was appointed judge of the court of justice of the European Union (General Court) as of 13 April 2016.

See also

European Court of Human Rights
List of judges of the European Court of Human Rights

References

External links
Website of the European Court of Human Rights

1962 births
Judges of the European Court of Human Rights
Presidents of the European Court of Human Rights
20th-century Luxembourgian lawyers
People from Luxembourg City
Alumni of Fitzwilliam College, Cambridge
Université catholique de Louvain alumni
Living people
Academic staff of Nancy-Université
Luxembourgian judges of international courts and tribunals
21st-century Luxembourgian judges